CCTC may refer to:

 California Commission on Teacher Credentialing, an independent agency created in 1970 by the Ryan Act
 Canadian Council for Tobacco Control, a registered Canadian charity
 Chemung Canal Trust Company, a New York State chartered trust company based in Elmira, New York, USA
 Churches of Christ Theological College, the national ministry and theological teaching college for the Conference of Churches of Christ in Australia
 Current Cost To Company.